Macrohomotoma is a genus of plant-parasitic hemipterans in the family Homotomidae. There are about 15 described species in Macrohomotoma.

Species
These 15 species belong to the genus Macrohomotoma:

 Macrohomotoma apsylloides (Crawford, 1919) c g
 Macrohomotoma geniculata Mathur, 1975 c g
 Macrohomotoma gladiata Kuwayama, 1908 c g b (curtain fig psyllid)
 Macrohomotoma guangxiense Li, 2011 c g
 Macrohomotoma hylocola Yang & Li, 1984 c g
 Macrohomotoma maculata Mathur, 1975 c g
 Macrohomotoma magna Yang & Li, 1984 c g
 Macrohomotoma minana Yang & Li, 1984 c g
 Macrohomotoma robusta Yang, 1984 c g
 Macrohomotoma sandakana Crawford, 1925 c g
 Macrohomotoma striata Crawford, 1925 c g
 Macrohomotoma suijiangiense Li, 2011 c g
 Macrohomotoma viridis Yang & Li, 1984 c g
 Macrohomotoma williamsi Crawford, 1925 c g
 Macrohomotoma yunana Yang & Li, 1984 c g

Data sources: i = ITIS, c = Catalogue of Life, g = GBIF, b = Bugguide.net

References

Further reading

External links

 

Psylloidea